Although it is difficult to measure how many people reside in the UK without authorisation, a Home Office study based on Census 2001 data released in March 2005 estimated a population of between 310,000 and 570,000. The methods used to arrive at a figure are also much debated. Problems arise in particular from the very nature of the target population, which is hidden and mostly wants to remain so. The different definitions of 'illegality' adopted in the studies also pose a significant challenge to the comparability of the data. However, despite the methodological difficulties of estimating the number of people living in the UK without authorisation, the residual method has been widely adopted. This method subtracts the known number of authorised migrants from the total migrant population to arrive at a residual number which represents the de facto number of unauthorised migrants.

More recently, a study carried out by a research team at LSE for the Greater London Authority, published in 2009, estimated the illegal migrant population of the UK by updating the Home Office study. The LSE's study takes into account other factors not included in the previous estimate, namely the continued arrival of asylum seekers, the clearance of the asylum applications backlog, further illegal migrants entering and leaving the country, more migrants overstaying, and the regularisation of EU accession citizens.

The most significant change in this estimate is, however, the inclusion of children born in the UK to illegal immigrants. For the LSE team illegal migrants oscillate between 417,000 and 863,000, including a population of UK-born children ranging between 44,000 and 144,000. Drawing on this and taking stock of the outcome of the recent Case Resolution Programme, a University of Oxford study by Nando Sigona and Vanessa Hughes estimated at the end of 2011 a population of illegal migrant children of 120,000, with over half born in the UK to parents residing without legal immigration status. A Greater London Authority funded study by researchers at the University of Wolverhampton's Institute for Community Research and Development updated these figures in 2020, and estimated that the figure in April 2017 was between 125,000 and 255,000 including between 191,000 and 241,000 children.

Definitions 

According to the House of Commons Library, several definitions for a migrant exist in United Kingdom so that a migrant can be:
    Someone whose country of birth is different to their country of residence.
    Someone whose nationality is different to their country of residence.
    Someone who changes their country of usual residence for a period of at least a year, so that the country of destination effectively becomes the country of usual residence.

Illegal immigrants in the UK include those who have:
 entered the UK without authority
 entered with false documents
 overstayed their visas
 worked or studied on a tourist visa/ non-immigrant visa waiver
 entered into forced or fraudulent marriage
 had their marriages terminated or annulled

Political reaction 
Migration Watch UK, is a think-tank opposed to immigration. Migration Watch UK has criticised the Home Office figures for not including the UK-born dependent children of unauthorised migrants. They suggest the Home Office has underestimated the numbers of unauthorised migrants by between 15,000 and 85,000.

Jack Dromey, Deputy General of the Transport and General Workers Union and Labour Party treasurer, suggested in May 2006 that there could be around 500,000 illegal workers. He called for a public debate on whether an amnesty should be considered. Former Home Secretary David Blunkett suggested that this might be done once the identity card scheme is rolled out. However the scheme was scrapped due to its widespread unpopularity by the coalition government in 2010.

London Citizens, a coalition of community organisations, is running a regularisation campaign called Strangers into Citizens, backed by figures including the leader of the Catholic Church in England and Wales, the Cardinal Cormac Murphy-O'Connor. Analysis by the Institute for Public Policy Research suggested that an amnesty would net the government up to  £1.038 billion per year in fiscal revenue. However, analysis by MigrationWatch UK suggests that if the migrants granted amnesty were given access to healthcare and other benefits, the net cost to the exchequer would be £5.530 billion annually.

It has since been suggested that to deport all of the irregular migrants from the UK would take 20 years and cost up to £12 billion. former Mayor of London Boris Johnson commissioned a study into a possible amnesty for illegal immigrants, citing larger tax gains within the London area which is considered to be home to the majority of the country's population of such immigrants.

In February 2008, the government introduced new £10,000 fines for employers found to be employing illegal immigrants where there is negligence on the part of the employer, with unlimited fines or jail sentences for employers acting knowingly.

In July 2013, the Home Office introduced an advertising lorry in London with its billboard saying "In the UK illegally? — GO HOME OR FACE ARREST — Text HOME to 78070 for free advice, and help with travel documents. We can help you return home voluntarily without fear of arrest or detention." This campaign was criticised from various quarters: Vince Cable, a prominent minister in the governing coalition, called it "stupid and offensive"; some on the left said that "go home" evoked an old National Front slogan. Nigel Farage of the UK Independence Party criticised the campaign as "nasty" and suggested that its real message was "Please don’t vote UKIP, we’re doing something".

In 2015 the newly elected Conservative Government announced it would be requiring Landlords to confirm the immigration status of tenants. Those failing to do so, or knowingly or unknowingly housing illegal immigrants could face criminal prosecution.  This policy is called "Right to Rent", part of the Hostile Environment.

In 2015 a large number of migrants had set up a camp at Calais in the hope of entering the UK illegally, although there have always been some migrants entering the UK illegally from here many illegal migrants or asylum seekers try to enter the UK from France, by hiding inside trucks or trains and they've done so for years.
This sparked a large political debate in the UK. The UK government responded by funding additional security measures in Calais including a £7 million fence to prevent migrants entering the UK.

Channel migrants 

There is significant public concern about illegal immigrants coming on small boats from France English Channel migrant crisis. However, this is a small portion of overall illegal immigration. As above, there are between 594,000 and 745,000 illegal immigrants in UK. In contrast a total of approximately 30,000 people came in on small boats in the calendar year 2021 and of these only approximately 10% are illegal immigrants (90% are legitimate refugees with a legal right to asylum in UK).

See also 
 English Channel migrant crisis
 Demography of the United Kingdom
 "Go Home" vans
 Immigration to the United Kingdom since 1922
 List of sovereign states and dependent territories by fertility rate
 MigrationWatch UK
 UK Visas and Immigration
 Calais Jungle

References 

 
United Kingdom
United Kingdom